Franklin Adubobi Jantuah (1929 – 27 January 2020) was a Ghanaian lawyer and politician. He was the Minister of State in the first republic and in the Provisional National Defence Council. He served as the Minister of Agriculture in the Nkrumah government and Minister for Local Government in the PNDC regime.

Early life and education
Jantuah was born in 1929 in Kumasi, the capital of the Ashanti Region. He had his early education at English Church Mission School in Kumasi and Asante College also in Kumasi from 1943 to 1944. He continued at Adisadel College, Cape Coast from 1945 to 1947. He proceeded to Korle-Bu Dispensing School in 1947 where he obtained a certificate in Pharmacy in 1948. In 1954, he left for England to study at the London Tutorial College and the University of London from 1956 to 1959. He studied law at the Inns of Court School of Law and was called to the bar at the Middle Temple, London.

Career and politics
He began legal practice in 1960. He entered the parliament in 1965 representing the Ejisu constituency during the first republic. On 13 June that same year, he was appointed Minister for Agriculture; a position he served in until February 1966 when the Nkrumah government was overthrown. During the Acheampong regime, he became a leading member of the People's Movement for Freedom and Justice (PMFJ); a political group that opposed the union government (Unigov) idea that was proposed by Ignatius Kutu Acheampong and his government. In 1974, he became a member of the Kumasi City Council and in 1983 became the chairman of the council equivalent to Mayor of Kumasi. He consequently became the Ashanti Regional secretary (Ashanti Regional minister) in the PNDC regime and in 1984 he was appointed Secretary for Local Government (minister for Local Government). He served in this capacity until 1986 when he was relieved of his duties on health grounds.

Personal life
He was the brother of Kwame Sanaa-Poku Jantuah; who was also a Ghanaian politician, and the father of the late Kojo Svedstrup Jantuah, a Ghanaian activist and author, and Nana Yaa Jantuah formerly of the Public Utility and Regulatory Commission as Public and Corporate Affairs Director. He died on Monday 27 January 2020 at the Komfo Anokye Teaching Hospital.

See also
 Minister for Food and Agriculture (Ghana)
Kwame Sanaa-Poku Jantuah

References

1929 births
2020 deaths
Akan people
20th-century Ghanaian lawyers
Agriculture ministers of Ghana
Convention People's Party (Ghana) politicians
People from Kumasi
Ghanaian MPs 1965–1966
Government ministers of Ghana
Alumni of Adisadel College
Alumni of the University of London
Alumni of the Inns of Court School of Law
Mayors of Kumasi